In mathematics, a chain complex is an algebraic structure that consists of a sequence of abelian groups (or modules) and a sequence of homomorphisms between consecutive groups such that the image of each homomorphism is included in the kernel of the next. Associated to a chain complex is its homology, which describes how the images are included in the kernels.

A cochain complex is similar to a chain complex, except that its homomorphisms are in the opposite direction. The homology of a cochain complex is called its cohomology.

In algebraic topology, the singular chain complex of a topological space X is constructed using continuous maps from a simplex to X, and the homomorphisms of the chain complex capture how these maps restrict to the boundary of the simplex. The homology of this chain complex is called the singular homology of X, and is a commonly used invariant of a topological space.

Chain complexes are studied in homological algebra, but are used in several areas of mathematics, including abstract algebra, Galois theory, differential geometry and algebraic geometry. They can be defined more generally in abelian categories.

Definitions
A chain complex  is a sequence of abelian groups or modules ..., A0, A1, A2, A3, A4, ... connected by homomorphisms (called boundary operators or differentials) , such that the composition of any two consecutive maps is the zero map. Explicitly, the differentials satisfy , or with indices suppressed, . The complex may be written out as follows.

The cochain complex  is the dual notion to a chain complex. It consists of a sequence of abelian groups or modules ..., A0, A1, A2, A3, A4, ... connected by homomorphisms  satisfying . The cochain complex may be written out in a similar fashion to the chain complex.

The index n in either An or An is referred to as the degree (or dimension). The difference between chain and cochain complexes is that, in chain complexes, the differentials decrease dimension, whereas in cochain complexes they increase dimension. All the concepts and definitions for chain complexes apply to cochain complexes, except that they will follow this different convention for dimension, and often terms will be given the prefix co-. In this article, definitions will be given for chain complexes when the distinction is not required.

A bounded chain complex is one in which almost all the An are 0; that is, a finite complex extended to the left and right by 0. An example is the chain complex defining the simplicial homology of a finite simplicial complex. A chain complex is bounded above if all modules above some fixed degree N are 0, and is bounded below if all modules below some fixed degree are 0. Clearly, a complex is bounded both above and below if and only if the complex is bounded.

The elements of the individual groups of a (co)chain complex are called (co)chains. The elements in the kernel of d are called (co)cycles (or closed elements), and the elements in the image of d are called (co)boundaries (or exact elements). Right from the definition of the differential, all boundaries are cycles. The n-th (co)homology group Hn (Hn) is the group of (co)cycles modulo (co)boundaries in degree n, that is,

Exact sequences

An exact sequence (or exact complex) is a chain complex whose homology groups are all zero. This means all closed elements in the complex are exact. A short exact sequence is a bounded exact sequence in which only the groups Ak, Ak+1, Ak+2 may be nonzero. For example, the following chain complex is a short exact sequence.

In the middle group, the closed elements are the elements pZ; these are clearly the exact elements in this group.

Chain maps
This is written out in the following commutative diagram.

A chain map sends cycles to cycles and boundaries to boundaries, and thus induces a map on homology .

A continuous map f between topological spaces X and Y induces a chain map between the singular chain complexes of X and Y, and hence induces a map f* between the singular homology of X and Y as well. When X and Y are both equal to the n-sphere, the map induced on homology defines the degree of the map f.

The concept of chain map reduces to the one of boundary through the construction of the cone of a chain map.

Chain homotopy

A chain homotopy offers a way to relate two chain maps that induce the same map on homology groups, even though the maps may be different. Given two chain complexes A and B, and two chain maps , a chain homotopy is a sequence of homomorphisms  such that . The maps may be written out in a diagram as follows, but this diagram is not commutative.

The map hdA + dBh is easily verified to induce the zero map on homology, for any h. It immediately follows that f and g induce the same map on homology. One says f and g are chain homotopic (or simply homotopic), and this property defines an equivalence relation between chain maps.

Let X and Y be topological spaces. In the case of singular homology, a homotopy between continuous maps  induces a chain homotopy between the chain maps corresponding to f and g. This shows that two homotopic maps induce the same map  on singular homology. The name "chain homotopy" is motivated by this example.

Examples

Singular homology

Let X be a topological space. Define Cn(X) for natural n to be the free abelian group formally generated by singular n-simplices in X, and define the boundary map  to be

where the hat denotes the omission of a vertex. That is, the boundary of a singular simplex is the alternating sum of restrictions to its faces. It can be shown that ∂2 = 0, so  is a chain complex; the singular homology  is the homology of this complex.

Singular homology is a useful invariant of topological spaces up to homotopy equivalence. The degree zero homology group is a free abelian group on the path-components of X.

de Rham cohomology

The differential k-forms on any smooth manifold M form a real vector space called Ωk(M) under addition. 
The exterior derivative d maps Ωk(M) to Ωk+1(M), and d = 0 follows essentially from symmetry of second derivatives, so the vector spaces of k-forms along with the exterior derivative are a cochain complex.

The cohomology of this complex is called the de Rham cohomology of M.  The homology group in dimension zero is isomorphic to the vector space of locally constant functions from M to R. Thus for a compact manifold, this is the real vector space whose dimension is the number of connected components of M.

Smooth maps between manifolds induce chain maps, and smooth homotopies between maps induce chain homotopies.

Category of chain complexes
Chain complexes of K-modules with chain maps form a category ChK, where K is a commutative ring.

If V = V and W = W are chain complexes, their tensor product  is a chain complex with degree n elements given by 

and differential given by 
  
where a and b are any two homogeneous vectors in V and W respectively, and  denotes the degree of a.

This tensor product makes the category ChK into a symmetric monoidal category. The identity object with respect to this monoidal product is the base ring K viewed as a chain complex in degree 0. The braiding is given on simple tensors of homogeneous elements by 

The sign is necessary for the braiding to be a chain map.

 .
We have a natural isomorphism

Further examples 
Amitsur complex
A complex used to define Bloch's higher Chow groups
Buchsbaum–Rim complex
Čech complex
Cousin complex
Eagon–Northcott complex
Gersten complex
Graph complex
Koszul complex
Moore complex
Schur complex

See also
 Differential graded algebra
 Differential graded Lie algebra
 Dold–Kan correspondence says there is an equivalence between the category of chain complexes and the category of simplicial abelian groups.
 Buchsbaum–Eisenbud acyclicity criterion
 Differential graded module

References

 
 

Homological algebra
Differential topology